The 10-pounder Parrott rifle, Model 1861 was a cast iron muzzle-loading rifled cannon that was adopted by the United States Army in 1861 and often used in field artillery units during the American Civil War. Like other Parrott rifles, the gun breech was reinforced by a distinctive wrought iron reinforcing band. The 10-pounder Parrott rifle was capable of firing shell, shrapnel shell (case shot), canister shot, or solid shot. Midway through the war, the Federal government discontinued the  version in favor of a  version. Despite the reinforcing band, the guns occasionally burst without warning, inflicting injury on the gun crews. The Confederate States of America manufactured a number of successful copies of the gun.

Background
Cannons needed to be strong enough to withstand the explosion that reduced the gunpowder charge to propellant gas. Bronze smoothbore cannons were in need of a larger gunpowder charge because there was windage – or space – between the shot and the barrel. Windage caused the propellant gases from the explosion to leak out, but it also reduced the stress on the gun barrel. With rifled cannon, the ammunition was designed to expand the shell so that there was no windage between the projectile and the gun barrel. This meant that a smaller gunpowder charge could hurl a rifled projectile farther, but it also meant that the gun barrel was subjected to greater stress. Bronze cannons rarely burst because the metal was flexible. Cast iron was stronger than bronze, but it was also more rigid. This made cast iron guns more prone to burst at the breech or muzzle.

In 1836, when Robert Parker Parrott was an ordnance officer in the US Army, he resigned to take a job with the West Point Foundry in Cold Spring, New York. A few years before the American Civil War, gun manufacturers wrestled with problem of rifling cannons. Bronze was too soft of a metal for rifling, while cast iron was hard enough but too brittle. Parrott attempted to solve this dilemma by inventing a cast iron rifled cannon that had a wrought iron reinforcing band wrapped around the breech. The problem with banded guns was that gravity acted on the bands as they cooled, making an uneven fit. Parrott solved the problem by slowly rotating the gun barrel during the cooling process. The gun was first developed in 1859–1860. Parrott later remarked, "I do not profess to think that they are the best gun in the world, but I think they were the best practical thing that could be got at the time".

Despite the reinforcing band, the gun would burst unpredictably at the muzzle or near the trunnions. The Parrott field guns were simple for the gun crews to operate and the guns were usable even if part of the muzzle was blown off. Another great advantage of the 10-pounder Parrott was its low average cost of $180 per gun barrel. Compared to this, the bronze 12-pounder Napoleon cost $550 and the 3-inch Ordnance rifle cost $350 per gun. On 23 May 1861, the US government accepted the first ten 10-pounder Parrott rifles. The West Point Foundry helped the Federal war effort to such a degree that a joke made the rounds that the US national emblem should be changed from an eagle to a parrot. The 20-pounder Parrott rifle (with banded breech) was also employed in field artillery units, but the 10-pounder Parrott was far more commonly used.

Manufacture
The West Point Foundry manufactured between 228 and 255 2.9-inch 10-pounder Parrott rifles, Model 1861 through the end of 1862. Because the Ordnance Department thoroughly trusted Robert Parrott, he acted as both gun founder and the inspecting ordnance officer, a unique arrangement. The rifling consisted of three equally-wide lands and grooves. At first the guns were equipped with a front sight at the muzzle and a pendulum hausse rear sight. This was soon replaced by a front sight on top of the right rimbase (at the trunnion) and a brass tangent sight mounted on the right side of the wrought iron band. On 24 September 1863, the Ordnance Board recommended that production of the 2.9-inch Parrott be halted and that existing guns be re-bored to 3-inch caliber. This decision may have been influenced by gun jams caused by accidentally loading the 2.9-inch Parrott with 3-inch ammunition. Between November 1864 and June 1865, 119 2.9-inch Parrott rifles were converted to 3-inch caliber, though none have survived. The West Point Foundry halted production of 2.9-inch Parrotts on 13 April 1863 and the new 3-inch versions did not appear until 12 February 1864. Altogether, 279 3-inch Parrott rifles, Model 1863 were manufactured until 4 September 1865.

In 1860, the West Point Foundry sold a Parrott rifle to the state of Virginia. The artillery piece was put through trials by none other than Thomas J. Jackson, a little-known Virginia Military Institute professor who later became the famous general. Impressed by its range and accuracy, Jackson gave it a glowing report, leading Virginia to order 12 more. These guns were probably of 2.9-inch caliber, but this is not certain. In any case, one of these Parrott rifles performed admirably at the Battle of Big Bethel on 10 June 1861. With the outbreak of war, the Tredegar Iron Works began manufacturing a copy of the 2.9-inch Parrott rifle for the Confederacy. Tredegar produced 80 2.9-inch Parrott rifles from 18 November 1861 to 20 February 1865. Other Confederate gun founders manufactured the Parrott rifles including A. B. Reading & Brother of Vicksburg, Mississippi, Street, Hungerford & Jackson of Memphis, Tennessee, and Bujac and Bennett of New Orleans. Five guns survived, but no manufacturer can be positively identified from their markings.

Specifications

The 10-pounder Parrott was manufactured with a right-hand gaining twist (increasing toward the muzzle). Meanwhile, a rifled projectile generally retained two-thirds of its initial velocity at 1,500 yds. and remained invisible in flight. However, a rifled projectile could become visible if the shell began to tumble out of control. Tumbling occurred when the shell failed to take the grooves inside the gun barrel or when the spin wore off in flight. The caliber was the same as that of a smoothbore 3-pounder gun, which fired a round shot with a diameter of 2.9 inches. Rifled projectiles were heavier than smoothbore shot because they were elongated.

The 10-pounder Parrott rifle was mounted on the standard carriage for the M1841 6-pounder field gun. Because its projectile weighed more than a 6-pound round shot, the rifle's greater recoil could damage the trail or the cheek pieces of the carriage. The 10-pounder Parrott rifle fired case shot (shrapnel), shell, and canister shot. The use of bolts (solid shot) was rare and it was generally not provided in the ammunition chests. Firing shell without the fuse would accomplish the same result as firing a solid shot from a rifled gun. Parrott ammunition was designed to be used. The Parrott rifles could also fire Hotchkiss ammunition, but gunners were forbidden to use Schenkl ammunition. One weakness of Parrott ammunition was the sabot's position at the projectile's base. This meant that the final impulse on the shell as it left the gun was on its base, potentially causing the shell to wobble.

For two reasons, canister shot fired from rifled guns was less effective than canister fired from a 12-pounder Napoleon or a M1841 12-pounder howitzer. First, the rifled gun's 2.9-inch or 3-inch bore was narrower than the 12-pounder's  bore and could hurl fewer canister balls. Second, the barrel's rifling caused the canister to be blasted in an irregular pattern. Union General Henry Jackson Hunt believed that the range of canister fired from rifled guns was only half the  effective range of canister fired from the 12-pounder Napoleon.

Federal batteries were organized with six guns of identical type early in the conflict. Each 6-gun battery required 14 6-horse teams and seven spare horses. The teams towed the six artillery pieces and limbers, six caissons, one battery wagon, and one traveling forge. Each caisson carried two ammunition chests and the limber carried one additional ammunition chest. The 10-pounder Parrott rifle carried 50 rounds in each ammunition chest. A memo from November 1863 specified that rifled guns should have 25 shells, 20 shrapnel (case shot), and five canister rounds in each ammunition chest. In March 1865, a memo recommended that each chest carry 30 shell, 15 shrapnel, and five canister rounds for rifled guns of the horse artillery.

History

Captain Richard Waterman of Battery C, 1st Rhode Island Light Artillery believed that the 10-pounder Parrott rifle was more accurate than the 3-inch Ordnance rifle at  range. Union General Quincy Adams Gillmore liked the Parrott rifles, noting that untrained artillery crews could easily learn how to operate them. Confederate officer Edward Porter Alexander wanted to get rid of his 10-pounder Parrott rifles and replace them with M1841 24-pounder howitzers. One artillery officer reported that the Parrott percussion shells performed very well with only two shells failing to explode out of about 30. The tendency of the Parrott rifles to burst without warning made them unpopular with their gun crews. Union Private Augustus Buell of 4th U.S. Artillery, Battery B wrote, "If anything could justify desertion by a cannoneer, it would be assignment to a Parrott battery".

In the First Battle of Kernstown on 23 March 1862, the Union troops temporarily under the command of Nathan Kimball included 4th U.S. Artillery, Battery E (Clark's) armed with six 10-pounder Parrott rifles. At the Battle of Antietam on 17 September 1862, the Union Army of the Potomac counted 57 10-pounder Parrott rifles while the Confederate Army of Northern Virginia had at least 43 available. Union 10-pounder Parrott rifles were almost all massed in four or six gun batteries. Meanwhile, the Confederates distributed theirs by ones, twos, or threes in mixed batteries. The six-gun Union batteries included Battery B, 1st New York Light Artillery (Pettit's), Battery A, 1st Rhode Island Light Artillery (Tompkins's), Battery A, 1st New Jersey Light Artillery (Hexamer's), and Battery D, 1st Pennsylvania Light Artillery (Durell's). McCarthy's Richmond Virginia battery consisted of two 10-pounder Parrott rifles and two 6-pounder field guns.

At the Second Battle of Corinth on 3–4 October 1862, Battery H, 1st Missouri Light Artillery was armed with a mix of 10-pounder Parrott rifles and 24-pounder howitzers. In 1862 alone, the US government ordered 270,699 Parrott projectiles. This included ammunition for Parrott rifles other than the 10-pounder. On 2 July 1863 during the Battle of Gettysburg, the six 10-pounder Parrott rifles of the 5th U.S. Artillery, Battery D commanded by Captain Charles E. Hazlett took position on Little Round Top. When General Gouverneur K. Warren pointed out that the guns would not be able to fire on their attackers, Hazlett replied, "The sound of my guns will be encouraging to our troops." In mid-war, the Army of the Potomac began replacing the 10-pounder Parrott with the 3-inch Ordnance rifle. By May 1864, only five of the 49 batteries in the Army of the Potomac were armed with 10-pounder Parrotts. The Parrott rifles were not used again after the end of the war.

Civil War artillery

Notes
Footnotes

Citations

References

Further reading

American Civil War artillery